The Jenkins County School District is a public school district in Jenkins County, Georgia, United States, based in Millen. It serves the communities of Millen and Perkins.

Schools 
The Jenkins County School District has one elementary school, one middle school, and one high school.

Elementary school
 Jenkins County Elementary School

Middle school
 Jenkins County Middle School

High school
 Jenkins County High School

References

External links

School districts in Georgia (U.S. state)
Education in Jenkins County, Georgia